The 1948 Globetrotters–Lakers game was a dramatic match-up between the Harlem Globetrotters and the Minneapolis Lakers. Played in Chicago Stadium, the game took place two years before professional basketball was desegregated. The Globetrotters' 61–59 victory – by two points at the buzzer – challenged prevailing racial stereotypes about the abilities of black athletes.

Background 

The idea for the game, which was held on February 19, 1948, was hatched by Globetrotters owner and coach Abe Saperstein and Lakers general manager Max Winter, two friends who both believed they had the best basketball team in the country. Each had good reason to think so. For two decades, the Globetrotters had traveled the country winning game after game. It was because the team was so unbeatable that the players first started clowning around to make the game more interesting. When the Globetrotters arrived at the Chicago Stadium to face the Lakers, they were on a 102-game winning streak.

The Lakers, on the other hand, were a new team, formed only six months earlier. But they were already on their way to becoming a powerhouse, with two future Hall of Famers: The 6'10" George Mikan, who is described by the NBA as the league's "first superstar", and Jim Pollard, whose leaping ability – he could dunk from the free throw line – inspired the nickname, "The Kangaroo Kid".

The Lakers, who took their name from Minnesota's designation as the "Land of 10,000 Lakes", were members of the Basketball Association of America (BAA), which was the precursor to the National Basketball Association (NBA). As a black team, the Globetrotters were not allowed into that league, or any professional league. A year earlier, Jackie Robinson had broken the color barrier in professional baseball, but basketball remained segregated. Four black basketball players had briefly been on various teams in another league, the National Basketball League. But when a fight between a white player and a black player during a game in Syracuse, New York, triggered a riot in the stands, black players quietly disappeared from the league.

Many sports fans, team owners, and coaches did not want to see teams integrated. Some held the racist view that blacks were not equipped for sports like basketball that required coordination, strategy, and finesse. In 1941, Dean Cromwell, the assistant head coach for the U.S. track team at the 1936 Summer Olympics, which included Jesse Owens, wrote that black athletes excelled in certain events because they were closer to primitive man than white men were.

Racism dominated other aspects of the Globetrotters' lives as well. The night before the game, the team checked into the same small two-story rooming house on the segregated South Side of Chicago that they visited every time they were in town. Called Ma Piersall's, its rooms were tiny, no more than ten feet by ten feet, and featured sagging single beds. Across town, the Lakers spent the night at the popular, luxurious, high-rise Morrison Hotel where a month earlier a black actress had been denied a room and told to find a room in a "South Side hotel for colored people".

The game 
A record number of fans showed up at Chicago Stadium to watch the Lakers face off against the Globetrotters. It was an exhibition game played right before the official Basketball Association of America contest between the Chicago Stags and the New York Knicks. Still in its infancy, professional basketball had never attracted more than 9,000 fans in Chicago. That day, nearly 18,000 filled the stadium.

The Globetrotters starting lineup, a combination of the best players from Saperstein's East and West units, featured Reece "Goose" Tatum, Marques Haynes, Ermer Robinson, Wilbert King, and Louis "Babe" Pressley.

During the first half, Laker fans had reason to gloat. Their team quickly jumped to a 9–2 lead. The Lakers held a significant height advantage over the Globetrotters, with several players towering over Tatum, the Globetrotters' star, six-foot-three center, and Haynes, who was barely six feet tall. Tatum turned out to be no match for Mikan, the Lakers' center, who scored 18 points in the first half while preventing Tatum from scoring at all.

At halftime, Minnesota led 32–23. During the break, Saperstein and his team devised a plan to defend Mikan with two men instead of one. They also decided to fast break each time they got the ball, to tire the Lakers out. The Globetrotters knew they were in great shape, having played nearly every night for as long as they could remember. The strategy worked. With both Tatum and Pressley guarding Mikan, he was able to score only 6 points in the second half. The Globetrotters tied the game for the first time in the third quarter. On several occasions they led, only to watch the Lakers come back to tie the score.

In the final quarter, both Tatum and Pressley fouled out from guarding Mikan so closely. The rest of the team picked up the slack. With 90 seconds left, the Lakers tied the game at 59 with a free throw. When the Globetrotters got the ball, Marques Haynes, who earlier in the game had teased the Lakers by dribbling while lying down on the court, dribbled to run out the clock, since there was no shot clock at the time. This was easy for Haynes: He once dribbled an entire fourth quarter to overcome a two-player handicap and sustain the Globetrotters' one-point lead.

With only a few seconds left, Haynes flipped the ball to Ermer Robinson, who was stationed 30 feet from the basket. Flexing his knees and holding the ball to his chest, Robinson let fly the one-handed shot he had practiced hundreds of times a day on his childhood courts in San Diego. It was the same shot he had already missed three times in a row, and he hadn't sunk any from that far out. But this time the ball went in. Screaming fans poured onto the court. When the Globetrotters reached their locker room, they hoisted Saperstein, who was wearing double-breasted suit and wide tie, onto their shoulders.

A year later, the Lakers and Globetrotters met for a rematch, with the Globetrotters again winning, this time 49–45. The teams met six more times after that, with the Lakers winning each of those games.

The aftermath 
The racial implications of the game were not immediately apparent. The Chicago Sun-Times headline, "Mikan Cooks Tatum's Goose", focused on the fact that the Globetrotter star only scored three baskets. Neither Saperstein nor Winter saw the game as being about race relations; they simply wanted to see which team was best. "I'm positive that he [Abe] didn't see it as a racial game", Gerald Saperstein, a cousin of Abe Saperstein's who was at the game, told the Associated Press.

But to many team owners in the young and struggling basketball leagues, there was a clear message: Not only were black players as talented and capable as white players, they added a level of excitement to the game that appealed to both white and black audiences. To black basketball fans, it was a moment of empowerment. "It just revitalized so many of us, from the fact that [it showed] what we can be", said John Chaney, the former longtime Temple University basketball coach who, in 1948, was a teenager in deeply segregated Jacksonville, Florida.

Two years later, in 1950, three former Globetrotters became the first black players on NBA teams. The Boston Celtics drafted Chuck Cooper, the New York Knicks signed center Nat "Sweetwater" Clifton, and the Tri-Cities Blackhawks (now the Atlanta Hawks) took Hank DeZonie.

As basketball became integrated, giving talented black players greater opportunity to play professionally, the Globetrotters had fewer recruits to choose from. Rather than try to compete with the NBA, Abe Saperstein transformed the Globetrotters into a touring act, first against teams of all-star college players around the country and then with ambitious tours of Europe, South America, and the rest of the world. The Globetrotters also expanded their dazzling ball handling and shooting tricks, cementing their reputation as "the magicians of basketball".

The Lakers went on to become an outstanding team, winning six professional basketball titles in the next seven years: 1948 (NBL), 1949 (BAA), 1950 (NBA), 1952 (NBA), 1953 (NBA), 1954 (NBA). When Mikan retired in 1954, the team struggled financially. To boost attendance and revenue, then-owner Bob Short relocated the team to Los Angeles before the 1960–61 season.

Chicago Stadium, the venue of the first Globetrotter-Lakers game, was demolished in 1995. The impact of that game, however, was felt for many years to come. "Those Lakers-Trotters games definitely contributed to the integration of the league", basketball historian Claude Johnson told ESPN.

References

Lakers
Minneapolis Lakers games
1947–48 in American basketball
Race in the United States
1948 in sports in Illinois
1940s in Chicago